The Latvia national under-16 and under-17 basketball team is the national representative for Latvia in international under-16 and under-17 basketball competitions. They are organized by the Latvian Basketball Association. 

The team competes at the FIBA U16 European Championship, with the opportunity to qualify for the FIBA Under-17 World Cup.

See also
Latvia national basketball team
Latvia national under-20 basketball team
Latvia national under-19 basketball team

References

External links
Official website 
FIBA profile

National sports teams of Latvia
 
Men's national under-16 basketball teams
Men's national under-17 basketball teams